Michael Theobald (born 7 March 1948) is a German academic theologian who is Professor of New Testament in the Catholic Theological Faculty at the University of Tübingen. 

Theobald's research focuses on the New Testament, particularly the Passion Narratives, the Gospel of John, and New Testament epistolary literature (especially the Apostle Paul's Letter to the Romans, and the pseudo-Pauline Epistle to the Ephesians and Pastoral Epistles).

Life 
Theobald studied theology at the Universities of Bonn and Münster (Germany) and received his Doctorate of Theology from the Rheinische Friedrich-Wilhelms-Universität Bonn, Germany in 1979. He earned his Habilitation (Dr. habil.) at the University of Regensburg, Germany in 1985. 

Theobald was Professor for Biblical Theology at the Freie Universität Berlin from 1985 to 1989, and since 1989 has been full Professor of New Testament at the University of Tübingen. 

Since 2009, Theobald has been the chair of the Katholischen Bibelwerks. He is a member of the "Kollegium Theologie" of the Deutschen Forschungsgemeinschaft, of the Studiorum Novi Testamenti Societas (SNTS), and of the Arbeitsgemeinschaft der deutschsprachigen Neutestamentler (AGNT). Theobald has also been elected to membership in the German Academy of Sciences Leopoldina, Halle (Saale).

Work 
Theobald has published very highly regarded scholarship on a wide variety of New Testament topics, including monographs on the Prologue of and dominical sayings in the Gospel of John, commentaries on Romans and the Fourth Gospel, and many articles and essays. He has also worked on the revision of the German Einheitsübersetzung.

Selected works

Books

Articles

References

External links
 Michael Theobald's faculty page at the University of Tübingen

1948 births
Living people
20th-century German Catholic theologians
21st-century German Catholic theologians
German biblical scholars
New Testament scholars
Roman Catholic biblical scholars
Academic staff of the University of Tübingen
University of Bonn alumni
University of Regensburg alumni
German male non-fiction writers